The Order "For Merit to the Republic of Dagestan", is the highest meritorious order awarded by the Dagestani government for exemplary service in accordance with Article 7.2 of the Law No. 6 “On State Awards of the Republic of Dagestan”.

Notable recipients 
 Phase Alievа — Knight of the Order No. 1
 Aliev Muhu Gimbatovich (2010) 
 Aliev, Shamil Gimbatovich (2013)
 Abdulatipov Ramazan Gadzhimuradovich
 Ahmad Afandi Abdulaev
 Abdulbekov, Zagalav Abdulbekovich (2015)
 Akhmedov, Magomed Akhmedovich (2015)
 Abakarov, Khizri Magomedovich (2020)
 Abdulmuslimov, Abdulmuslim Mukhudinovich (2020)
 Amirkhanov, Abdulpat Gadzhievich (2022)
 Baachilov, Magomed Huseynovic (2016)
 Hajiyev, Gadzhi Muslimovich (2010)
 Hasanova, Mui Rashidovna (2010) 
 Gamzatov, Gamzat Magomedovich (2010) 
 Gamzatova, Hapisat Magomedovna (2011)
 Golikova, Tatiana Alekseevna
 Gazimagomedov, Magomedrasul Mukhtarovich (2018)
 Gadzhimagomedov, Muslim Gamzatovich (2019)
 Dzasokhov, Alexander Sergeevich (November 2017) 
 Jamaludinov, Magomed Kazievich 
 Kerimov, Suleiman Abusaidovich (April 2013)
 Ibragimov, Ibrahim Magomedovich (2014) 
 Kamilov, Ibragimkhan Kamilovich (2015) 
 Kerimov, Magomed Khizrievich 
 Kazhlaev, Murad Magomedovich 
 Kaziev, Shapi Magomedovich (April 2016) 
 Murtazaliev, Omar Murtazalievich (2009) 
 Makhachev, Gadzhi Nuhievich (2011) 
 Makhachev, Islam Ramazanovich (2022) 
 Magomaev, Huseyn Saigidovich (2011)
 Makhulov, Magomed Makhulovich (2013) 
 Magomedov, Ziyavudin Gadzhievich (2013) 
 Magomedov, Magomedali Magomedovich (May 2014) 
 Nazhmudinov, Kasum Huseynovich (2013) 
 Nurmagomedov, Khabib Abdulmanapovich (2018, December 5, 2019) 
 Nurmagomedov, Abdulmanap Magomedovich (December 5, 2019) 
 Osmanov, Ahmed Ibrahimovich (2014) 
 Vladimir Putin (September 2014) 
 Sadulaev, Abdulrashid Bulachevich 
 Tolboev, Magomed Omarovich (2011) 
 Tolboev, Taigib Omarovich 
 Saygidpasha Umakhanov 
 Khloponin, Alexander Gennadievich (September 2015)
 Chalaev, Shirvani Ramazanovich  
 Shakhov, Shahabas Kuramagomedovich (2016)
 Shaimiev, Mintimer Sharipovich (April 2017) 
 Yusupov, Magomed Yusupovich (2010)
 Lev Kuznetsov (March 2016) 
 Samuel Eto’o (March 2014)
 Aleksandr Karelin (September 2017)

See also 
 Awards and decorations of the Russian Federation

References

Civil awards and decorations of Russia
Culture of Dagestan
Russian awards
Awards established in 1995